Perikoala is an extinct genus of marsupials, related to the modern koala. The genus diverged from a common ancestor of the other koala genera Nimiokoala, Litokoala, and Phascolarctos, which contains the living koala.

Two species are recognised
 Perikoala palankarinnica Stirton 1957
 Perikoala robustus Woodburne et al. 1987

References 

Prehistoric mammals of Australia
Prehistoric vombatiforms
Pleistocene marsupials
Koalas
Prehistoric marsupial genera